Trafford General Hospital is a district general hospital in Davyhulme, Greater Manchester, England, managed by Manchester University NHS Foundation Trust.

History

Early history
Work began on what was originally named Davyhulme Park Hospital, established by the Barton-upon-Irwell Union, in 1926. The Barton-upon-Irwell Union had been established in keeping with the requirement of the Poor Law Amendment Act 1834 for parishes to create unions offering provision to the poor. The hospital opened to patients on 17 December 1928, officially opened by Princess Mary, Viscountess Lascelles on 1 June 1929. When the Local Government Act 1929 abolished the poor law unions, the hospital passed to Lancashire County Council.

During the Second World War it functioned initially as a British military hospital, the first patients arriving in 1940 as a result of the German invasion of Norway. Later the hospital was transferred to the US military becoming the 10th US Station Hospital where it hosted Glenn Miller and the United States Air Force Band to entertain the American troops. After the War it was de-requisitioned and returned to Lancashire County Council.

Postwar
The hospital is regarded as the first National Health Service hospital. Known as Park Hospital, it was visited by the then health minister Aneurin Bevan on 5 July 1948. In a symbolic ceremony, Aneurin Bevan received the keys from Lancashire County Council alongside a 'guard of honour' of nurses.

Sylvia Diggory (née Beckingham), then 13, was the first NHS patient. Before she died, Sylvia said: "Mr Bevan asked me if I understood the significance of the occasion and told me that it was a milestone in history – the most civilised step any country had ever taken, and a day I would remember for the rest of my life – and of course, he was right."

The facility was renamed Trafford General Hospital in 1988. The maternity unit was closed in 2010 and the accident and emergency unit was closed in 2013 under instruction by health secretary Jeremy Hunt, despite a long campaign by interested parties. Emergency care provision was reduced to a nursing and GP service after emergency consultant care was withdrawn in 2016.

See also
 Healthcare in Greater Manchester
 List of hospitals in England

References

External links
  Trafford General where it all began

Manchester University NHS Foundation Trust
Hospitals in Greater Manchester
Buildings and structures in Trafford
NHS hospitals in England